Jari Ivan Vella (born 13 December 1985), known professionally as Ensi, is an Italian rapper proficient in freestyle. He won the first edition of MTV Spit in 2012.

Discography

With the OneMic
2005: Sotto la cintura
2011: Commerciale

Solo albums
2008: Vendetta
2012: Era tutto un sogno
2014: Rock Steady
2017: V2019: CLASHSingles
2009: "Terrone"

Collaborations
2003
Canebullo ft. Ensi - E se non fossimo così???2004
21 Grammi ft. Ensi - Zitti2005
Gli Inquilini ft. Ensi, Willie Dbz, Easy One & Maloscantores
DJ Double S ft. Ensi & Raige - Faccio muovere le teste2006
Raige & Zonta ft. Ensi - CuoreRaige & Zonta ft. Ensi - BluDynamite Soul Men ft. Ensi - Dynamite Ensi OneMicDJ Double S & Dj Kamo ft. Ensi - The Zamurriata TaurinenseRubo ft. Ensi - LongevityRubo ft. Ensi - Inevitabile (1600 giorni)2007
Kiave ft. Ensi & DJ Tsura - PazienzaRayden ft. Ensi & Raige - NoiRayden ft. Ensi - Sin CityRayden ft. Ensi, Raige & Lil'Flow - La UannamaicaDJ Tsura & Luda ft. Ensi & Fat Joe - Make It RainDJ Double S ft. Ensi - IntroDJ Double S ft. Ensi - Torino Top FlowDJ Double S ft. Ensi - Quattro LettereDJ Double S ft. Ensi - Outro2008
Jake La Furia ft. Ensi & 'Nto - Libro Senza CuoreMondo Marcio ft. Ensi - Che ti piaccia o noTormento & El Presidente ft. Ensi - Non è pocoDaniele Vit ft. Ensi - Tu Non Immagini prod. Fish -
2009
Raige ft. Ensi e Rayden - Di che parloRaige ft. Ensi - Sempre quiRaige ft. Ensi e Rayden - Una volta e per sempreRaige ft. Ensi - Non è ugualeDJ Nais ft. Ensi & Raige - Non Voglio ProblemiDJ Nais ft. Ensi - La Mia GenteP-Easy ft. Ensi, Evergreen, Libo, Rayden, Asher Kuno, Pula & Tommy Smoka - " V.I.P. Superstarz"
Maxi B ft. Ensi & Michel - Certi AmiciDJ Fede ft. Ensi - Stessi GuaiGué Pequeno ft. Ensi - "Grand Royal"
Bassi Maestro & Babaman ft. Ensi & Supa - "Ad Ogni Costo (Rap-Or-Die)"
Brain ft. Ensi, Prosa & Michasoul - "Sono"
Fratelli Quintale ft. Ensi - "Come Fa"
Rayden ft. Ensi, Raige & DJ Double S - "Timeline"
Rubo ft. Ensi & Radio Rade - "XXXXL (Heavy Rap)"
Rubo ft. Ensi, Speaker Cenzou, Brain, Pensie & Fure Boccamara - "Figli Dei '90s"
Two Fingerz ft. Ensi - Pensare MenoBig Fish ft. Ensi & Vacca - Generazione Tuning'Nto, Ensi & Entics - Nient'altro2010
DJ Jad ft. Ensi - Così lontaniVacca ft. Ensi - MiliardoClub Dogo ft. Ensi, Entics, Vacca & Emis Killa - Spacchiamo tuttoExo ft. Jake La Furia, Emis Killa, Ensi, Luchè, Surfa, Vacca e Daniele Vit - Fino alla fineEmis Killa ft. Ensi - Ho visto (prod. Rayden)
Purple Finest ft. Ensi - Come si può (da Pure Pleasure)
2011
Sody feat. Danti, Ensi, Daniele Vit - Il genio della lampoGuè Pequeno feat. Entics, Ensi, 'Nto, Marracash, Jake La Furia & Nex Cassel - Big!Mondo Marcio Feat. Ensi & Palla - Cos´hai di nuovolouis Dee Feat. Ensi - non ci prendiamo in giroEntics feat. Ensi - EquilibrioMixUp feat. Chief & Ensi - Milano Libera TuttiEmis Killa feat. Ensi - Il Resto Del MondoNex Cassel feat. Ensi - Paura E SoldiEmis Killa feat. Ensi - Tutti In CateneBassi Maestro feat. Ensi - Sopra La Cintura2012
Max Brigante feat. Ensi - Allenatichefabene RemixEl Raton, Ensi, Salmo, En?gma, Bassi Maestro, Rocco Hunt, Gemitaiz - King's SupremeGuè Pequeno feat. Ensi & Zuli - Forza campioneLil' Pin, Kennedy & DJ Yodha feat. Mistacabo & Ensi - Un'altra bomba''

Notes

Italian rappers
1985 births
Living people
Musicians from Turin
MTV Spit winners